The Bhambi Rohit are a Hindu caste found in the state of Gujarat in India. They are a sub-group within the Bhambi community. They used to claim to be Rajput via Rajputization.

Origin 

The community gets its name from Rohidas, a Hindu saint, and Rohit are followers of this saint. They broke away from the Bhambi Khalpa community, when they decided to abandon the traditional occupation of the Bhambi, which was leather shoemaking. According to other traditions, the Rohit are a sub-group of the Rajput community due to Rajputization. They are found in the districts of Kaira, Surat, Ahmedabad, and Baroda. The Rohit are a Gujarati speaking community.

Present circumstances 

The Rohit are an endogamous community, and practice clan exogamy. Historically, they used to intermarry with the Bhambi Khalpa, but this has been discontinued. Historically, the Rohit were leather tanners and shoemakers, but like other artisan communities are abandoning their traditional occupation. Many are now employed as wage labourers.

See also 

Bhambi Sindhi Mochi
Bhambi Khalpa

References

Indian castes
Tribal communities of Gujarat
Scheduled Castes of Rajasthan
Scheduled Castes of Gujarat